2022 Winter SM Town: SMCU Palace (stylized as 2022 Winter SMTOWN : SMCU PALACE) is the tenth winter album by SM Town. It was released by SM Entertainment on December 26, 2022. The album contains ten tracks that saw various collaborations of the label's artists, with two singles have been released to support the album; "Beautiful Christmas" was released as the album's lead single on December 14, 2022, and "The Cure", released as the second single on January 1, 2023, during the annual online free concert SM Town Live 2023: SMCU Palace at Kwangya.

Background and release 

The concept of the album is the continuation of its predecessor 2021 Winter SM Town: SMCU Express (2021), where the "SMCU Palace" is the place set in the imaginary land of the SM Culture Universe lore, Kwangya. Described by SM Entertainment as the combination of artists' collaboration that would never be seen anywhere else, the album contains collaborations between artists in the label, and was released on December 26, 2022. The album led by its lead single "Beautiful Christmas", a collaboration of Red Velvet and Aespa, was released on December 14, 2022, twelve days prior the album release date. It was followed by "The Cure", a collaboration of Kangta, BoA, and all SM's group's leader, released as the second single.

A total of 58 artists from the label participated in the album, including Kangta, BoA, TVXQ!, Super Junior (except Heechul among the actively-promoting members), Taeyeon and Hyoyeon from Girls' Generation, Shinee (except Taemin), Exo (except Lay, Baekhyun, and D.O.), Red Velvet, NCT (except Lucas), Aespa, and the Scream Records DJs: Ginjo (formerly of Traxx), Raiden, Imlay, and Mar Vista.

Composition 
The lead single, "Beautiful Christmas", which is the collaboration of the label's girl groups Red Velvet and Aespa, was described as a carol dance track with a lively swing rhythm centered on rhythmic bass and piano performances, conveying the song's message that today is the best moment with a loved one, doubling the exciting party atmosphere. The second single, "The Cure", was described as a pop song characterized by an exciting African rhythm and a choir full of scale.

Track listing

Charts

Weekly charts

Monthly charts

Year-end chart

Certifications and sales

Release history

References 

SM Town albums
2022 albums
SM Entertainment albums
2022 Christmas albums
Concept albums
Christmas albums by South Korean artists